Guangshan County (postal: Kwangshan) is a county in the southeast of Henan province, China. It is under the administration of Xinyang city. The regional dialect is the Xinyang city dialect of Southwestern Mandarin.

The 13th five-year plan of Xinyang city puts forward the concept of "integration of decoration and light", accelerates the integrated development of Huangchuan and Guangshan counties, constructs the sub central city of the city area, and supports the withdrawal of counties into cities.

Administrative divisions
As 2012, this county is divided to 2 subdistricts, 7 towns and 10 townships.
Subdistricts
Xianshan Subdistrict
Zishui Subdistrict

Towns

Townships

Climate

See also
 Chenpeng Village Primary School stabbing
 Wenshu Township

References

External links
Official website of Guangshan County Government

County-level divisions of Henan
Xinyang